Tofail Ahmed (22 February 1919 – 28 March 2002) was a well-known Bangladeshi researcher of Folk Art. He was also a collector of Folk artifacts and has authored several books on Bangladeshi Folk arts and Crafts. He was awarded the Shilu Abed Karushilpa Award for his contribution to Folk Arts and Craft in 1998. He was also elected as an honorary fellow of the Bangla Academy in 2001.

Early life and career
Ahmed was educated at University of Calcutta where he completed his MA in Economics in 1944. He started his teaching career at Calcutta Islamia College. He also taught at Chakhar College in Barisal. He later moved to Government Saadat College in Karatia Union where he was the Principal of the college for seventeen years. In 1980 he retired as director of the Bangladesh Council.

Major contributions
Ahmed made significant contributions to Bangladeshi folk art. He has collected and preserved many specimens of folk artifacts which are now extinct. During 1984–1987, as part of the Karika project on Folk crafts and design documentation, he visited about 1500 villages all over Bangladesh and collected rare Folk artifacts. Here he discovered the rare Gazir Pat, which is a form of scroll painting used to illustrate the life of Gazi Pir. Previously, it was believed that the only preserved piece of this art was at the Asutosh Museum of Indian Art in Calcutta. Ahmed established a private folk museum in his private residence in Lalmatia, Dhaka. It has been open to public ever since.

Bibliography
 Amader Prachin Shilpa (Our ancient crafts and industries) 1964
 Lokashilpa (Folk arts and crafts) 1985
 Yuge Yuge Bangladesh (Bangladesh through the ages) 1992
 Lokashilper Bhubane (In the realm of folk art) 1993
 Dhakar Banijyik Karukala (The commercial crafts of Dhaka) 1993
 Loka Aitihyer Dash Diganta (Ten dimensions of folk tradition) 1999

References

1919 births
2002 deaths
People from Lakshmipur District
University of Calcutta alumni
Academic staff of the University of Calcutta
Bangladeshi artists
Bangladeshi academics
Bangladeshi male writers
Place of death missing